William Herbert Hainsworth (27 May 1881 – 13 February 1955) was an Australian rules footballer who played with Carlton in the Victorian Football League (VFL).

Notes

External links 

Herb Hainsworth's profile at Blueseum

1881 births
Australian rules footballers from Victoria (Australia)
Carlton Football Club players
1955 deaths